Francesco Potenzano was an Italian painter, poet, and promoter, called The Great. He was a native of Palermo. He travelled to Rome, Naples, Malta, and through a large part of Spain. He died in 1599.

References

1599 deaths
16th-century Italian painters
Italian male painters
Painters from Palermo
Italian Renaissance painters
Year of birth unknown